Maria Hart ( born Barbara Ann McGhee; May 28, 1923 in Los Angeles, California – August 9, 2012 in Canoga Park, California) was an actress under contract to MGM from 1941 to 1948.

Biography
She was born as Barbara Ann McGhee on May 28, 1923 to Edna and James William McGhee. 

Hart left grand opera and light opera to perform in films after touring in The Desert Song and singing in The Masked Ball and Pagliacci in Los Angeles. She had roles in The Fighting Stallion (1950) and Border Outlaws (1950). She starred in the movie Cattle Queen (1951); and co-starred in Outlaw Women (1952) and The Lusty Men (1952).

Hart was married to movie producer Jack Seaman until their divorce in 1948; they had daughter, Rosalind Jill Seaman. Maria Hart also had a daughter, Georgianna, by a previous marriage. Seaman was Hart's producer for Cattle Queen and Border Outlaws for United-International. They remained on good terms.

On January 22, 1951, she married actor Drake Smith in a double wedding with Jack Seaman. Smith had been her leading man in Cattle Queen.

Selected filmography
 Cattle Queen (1951)

References

External links

1923 births
American film actresses
2012 deaths
People from Greater Los Angeles
21st-century American women